Interwetten.com Racing is a racing team from Austria. It was founded in 2001 by Walter Raus.

Career
The team started its career in Formula Volkswagen, and in its second year of operations won the championship with the German driver Sven Barth.

In 2004 they moved up to Formula Renault V6 Eurocup with drivers Sven Barth and Jaap van Lagen, with sponsorship from the Austrian bookmaking agency Interwetten, with Barth winning the Monaco race and Van Lagen taking a win Oschersleben.

The following year, Renault founded the World Series by Renault, merging World Series by Nissan and Formula Renault V6 Eurocup and Interwetten remained. Fernando Rees drove for the team and scored a series of impressive Qualifying results.

But they would have to wait until 2006, for their first success with Andy Soucek and Eric Salignon taking several race victories, giving Interwetten the Teams Championship.

New driver Salvador Durán brought Telmex in as sponsor for 2007, winning one race while teammate Daniil Move failed to score a point. In 2008 the Austrian team ran Durán alongside compatriot Pablo Sánchez López.

In 2010, the team has announced it wants to expand to include the Formula Renault 2.0 Eurocup series.

Interwetten.com Racing, managed by Motorsport Consulting GmbH, was not selected by Renault-Sport for the 2010 Formula Renault 3.5 Series. Instead, a new team, FHV Interwetten.com, managed by FHV GmbH, was selected.

Results

World Series by Renault

Formula Renault V6 Eurocup

* D.C. = Drivers' Championship position, T.C. = Teams' Championship position.

Timeline

References

External links
 Official website

Austrian auto racing teams
World Series Formula V8 3.5 teams
Formula Renault Eurocup teams
Intercontinental Rally Challenge teams
Auto racing teams established in 2001